Hungama may refer to:

 Hungama (1971 film), a Bollywood comedy film
 Hungama (2003 film), a Bollywood comedy
 Hungama (2005 film), a Telugu comedy film
 Hungama TV, an Indian children's television channel
 Hungama Digital Media Entertainment, Bollywood media company
 "Hungama Hai Kyon Barpa", Urdu poem by Indian writer and poet Akbar Allahabadi

See also 
 Bollywood Hungama, a Bollywood entertainment website
 Hangama, singer from Afghanistan